Petr Javurek is a male former international table tennis player from Slovakia.

He won a bronze medal at the 1991 World Table Tennis Championships in the Swaythling Cup (men's team event) with Tomáš Janči, Roland Vimi, Petr Korbel and Milan Grman for Czechoslovakia.

See also
 List of table tennis players
 List of World Table Tennis Championships medalists

References

Czech male table tennis players
Living people
World Table Tennis Championships medalists
Year of birth missing (living people)